The Roman Catholic Diocese of Vellore is a diocese located in the city of Vellore in the Ecclesiastical province of Madras and Mylapore in India.

History
It was established as a Diocese of Vellore on 13 November 1952 from the Metropolitan Archdiocese of Madras. The Diocese of Vellore was started by Salesians in 1952 carving out a portion from the Archdiocese of Madras-Mylapore. Further, in 1969, a few parishes from the Archdiocese of Pondicherry-Cuddalore were attached to this Diocese. It comprises two civil districts namely Vellore and Tiruvannamalai. There are 84 parishes with having Catholic population of 1, 50,000.

Origin as a Jesuit mission

The Catholic Mission in North Arcot dates back to 1604. The following chronicles gathered from various sources will give some historical knowledge of this Mission, its foundation and development in the course of over 350 years. The last great prince of the declining Vijayanagar empire (now in [[Andhra Pradesh]]), Venkatapathy Deva Rayalu, conquered the kingdom of Vellore in January 1604 and named it Raya Elluru. Elapuri or Elluru in Telugu language would mean city or town. Raya Elluru was meant a town conquered by the king Rayalu and thus the town was named after him – combination of two words Raya and Elapuri.

There were then some Jesuit Fathers at the court of King Rayalu at Chandragiri. He took them also to his new court at Vellore. The word Vellore derives from the Tamil word 'Vel' which means 'spear'; according to another conjecture there were idols of Tamil God 'Murugan' holding 'Vel' in and around Vellore. Vellore was formerly called Velappadi (a place thickly surrounded by a particular tree called 'Velamaram') and for this reason and background the name Vellore came into existence. The Jesuits who had come with their followers here allowed by the King to build again and it is now with the Anglican Church). Ancient Jesuit documents show that among these Jesuits, there was one named Fr. Antonious Rubunus, a preacher and confessor, who was commuting between Chandragiri and Vellore. He was sent to Japan on 12 August 1642. On 22 March 1643 he was martyred at Nagasaki. In 1610, there was a general upheaval against the Jesuits.

The Jesuit residences at Chandragiri and at Vellore were suppressed by a Royal order of the king Philip III of Spain and Portugal in 1611.
Formal Christian faith came to the diocese of Vellore towards the last quarter of the 17th century from the Madurai Mission. Fr. Andrew Preyre, S.J. seems to have been the first to evangelise Vellore. St. John de Britto and his disciple Fr. Francis Laynis visited Vellore in 1680 and 1683. Fr. Francis Laynis, (later Bishop of Mylapore), founded in 1683 and 1691 the mission of Koratampet, the first one in the present diocese of Vellore – in the Taluk of Chengam, North Arcot district, some 80 km South-West of Vellore. In 1699 the first French Jesuit Missionaries settled down at Pondicherry, after closing the Mission of Siam. In 1700 a certain Fr. Mandayat began the Jesuit Carnatic Mission at Puliyur, South of Uthiramerur, Chinglepet district like an Indian Sanyasi just as the Fathers of the Madurai Mission did in those days.

Vellore was surrounded by the Mughuls and was taken over by them in the following year. In 1702, Fr. Mandayat founded the mission of Thakkolam (Arakonam Taluk), which was later placed under the care of Fr. Varance Bouchet. In 1703, he was subjected to persecution and was arrested. Later, he was released by the Governor of the Province, Sek Sahib, at the intervention of Fr. Pierre Martin. During the short time he spent at Vellore he decided to erect a chapel and residence under the patronage of Mary. Later, he and his catechist were thrown out of the city after being severely beaten. It was obvious that the Moghuls did not welcome the idea of Christianity getting established at Vellore.

In 1712, Fr. De La Fontain, Superior of the Carnatic Mission intervened to bring to an end the persecution carried out by the Prince Dewan Hall. He approached the Nawab of Arcot through a Catholic Medical officer of the Nawab of Vellore. The Nawab of Arcot gave Freedom. In 1736, Fr. Jacques de Saignes had two churches built at Vellore and at Arcot. He stayed for a month in these places. He was provided with meals from the Rayal palace.
In 1740, when the Maharaja moved from Vellore to Gingee, Fr. Joseph Trumbley was in charge of Athipakkam (South Arcot) and Koratampet (North Arcot). He wrote that one of his churches was plundered, another burnt down. The church at the Fort of Vellore was destroyed. 21 villages in which most parishioners lived were sacked. Many Catholics were murdered, and others had to leave.
In 1748 the Nawab of Vellore granted one and a half acres of dry land to the priest, along the road, and another piece of land near the hill at Vellore. Two similar grants were made also to the priest at Arcot. In those days the Nawabs were dealing with the donation of lands to priests because the Zamindars were not willing to do this. In 1774, when Punganur (Andhra Pradesh) was occupied by Hyder Ali, a group of Telugu Catholics were brought by Fr. Henri Arnoult to Christianpet (North Arcot). Two families of Rajas from Rajampet in Cuddappah were baptised and then, taken into the service of the Nawab of Vellore. Their descendants are now at Christianpet 10 km North Arcot of Vellore.

Missionaries of the Foreign Missions Society, Paris

In 1777, the Fathers of the Paris Foreign Missions who were at Pondicherry were given charge of the former Jesuit South Indian Mission under the general name of Malabar Mission, which was also called formerly Carnatic Mission and formerly Pondicherry Mission. The Mission among Tamils was known as the Mission in the Province of Arcot. It fared rather badly.

In 1784, the persecution of Tippu Sultan dispersed several Catholic communities from the ancient Carnatic Mission in Rayalaseema. Some groups went to Vellore under the protection of the British. The Mudali Catholics of Pudur moved of Koratampet and Telugu Reddies and Kavarais settled at Kaniyambady, 12 km South of Vellore.

In 1801, there were about 2,000 Catholics in the region of Vellore. In 1806, Fr. Arnoult died. Fr. Manenty died on 25 May 1812. Fr. Jean Austruay of the Paris Foreign Missions took charge of the Catholics of Vellore region. In 1817, a church was begun at Kortampet. In 1834, Msgr. Bonnand, as co-adjuster to the Prefect Apostolic of Pondicherry, came to Vellore for his first pastoral visitation. A church was built there at the foot of the western hills.

Creation of Vicariates Apostolic

When the Vicariates Apostolic were created in 1832, Vellore and Southern part of North district formed part of the Vicariate Apostolic of Pondicherry under the Paris Foreign Missions. The North and North Eastern parts of the district, beyond the Trunk Road of Madras – Bangalore, namely the three taluks of Arakonam, Walajapet and Gudiyattam came to form part of the Vicariate Apostolic of Madras and it was entrusted to Mill Hill Fathers.

In 1841, the church at Koratampet was completed. It measured 60 ft. by 15 ft. In 1846 the mission of Vellore had 3,341 Catholics, mostly from the depressed outcaste people. They were served by a priest, four catechists, one school, a main church and eight chapels.

Arcot cantonment had 484 Catholics, of whom were in the light cavalry; Kaveripakkam had three or four Catholic families; Alapakkam about 100 Catholics and Christianpet 13 families. As the old church at Vellore was too small and in a miserable condition, the site of a local tank bed was bought for Rs. 200/- in 1847, and the foundation was laid for a new big church. In 1850, Fr. Moncourrier of the Paris Foreign Missions build a church and presbytery at Adakambarai on a site given by two Catholics.
On 9 February 1854, the new church at Vellore was solemnly blessed by Msgr. Bonnand. After 100 years this church was found in a very bad condition and needed much repair. With a sum of one lakh of rupees it was repaired, extended and remodelled. It served as the Cathedral church of the diocese of Vellore from 1952. Again, this church was further extended with two wings with new concrete slab structure and was consecrated on 3 January 1988 by Cardinal Simon Lourdusamy, the Prefect of the Congregation for Oriental Churches when Fr. A. Nambikairaj was the Parish Priest.
In 1884, the Catholic population numbered 3,376 at Vellore; 1429 at Kortampet; 2,473 at Polur; 2,546 at Koviloor and 15,751 at Chettupattu and Arni. Archbishop Joseph Morel of Pondicherry (1909–29) and Archbishop Mederlet (1928–34) of Madras were those who played a great role in the formation of the diocese of Vellore in the initial stage.

Pondicherry missionary Fr. Francis Darras, also called the Apostle of North Arcot, welcomed into the Church 30,000 persons and founded several parishes in North Arcot district during 1876–1916. He built the Shrine of Our Lady of Lourdes at Chethupattu in 1896 and a chapel on the hill near by in 1880. It is now the Shrine of Our Blessed Lady and the biggest center of pilgrimage in the diocese of Vellore.

Arrival of Salesians of Don Bosco

In April 1928, the mission of North Arcot with nine parishes, which were under the French Fathers, was consigned by the Holy See to the Salesians of Don Bosco. After three months, Fr. Eugene Mederlet, the first Salesian parish priest of Vellore, was made Archbishop of Madras to succeed Bishop Aelen John (1911–1928). The Archbishop of Madras was entrusted to the Salesians of Don Bosco, and the Salesian mission of North Arcot and the three taluks of Palmaner, Tiruthanni and Chittoor in the civil district of Chittoor were added to the territory of the Archdiocese to Madras.
After the death of the Archbishop Mederlet on 12 December 1934, Bishop Louis Mathias was transferred from the See of Shillong to the Archdiocese of Madras, and he took charge of it on 20 July 1935 and governed it till 1965. One of his outstanding achievements was the formation of the dioceses of Vellore and Thanjavur in 1952.

Favourable factors for Christianity in North Arcot

The Portuguese had control over coastal areas of Tamil Nadu and Santhome (Mylapore) in the 16th and the first half of the 17th centuries. Whenever the Portuguese exercised any authority or influence they supported the spread of Catholicism. The interior of Tamil Nadu was influenced by Mughal ruler Akbar with his friendly attitude to all religions, and similarly by Tirumala Nayak and Queen Mangammal of Madurai and the Kathirava Narasmiah Raj Udayar of Mysore. They all allowed the Christian priests to preach freely in their territories and convert the people to Christianity. The last great prince Venkatapathy Deva Rayalu of Vijayanagar conquered the kingdom of Vellore in 1604 and as we mentioned earlier, he kept two Jesuit priests in his court, first at Chandragiri and later at Vellore, and allowed them to build a church at Vellore fort.

The first Portuguese Jesuits were called back by king Philip III due to their scandalous life, and this hindered evangelisation. Fr. Rubino wrote to the Jesuit general "The missionaries must adapt themselves to Indian customs".

The Renaissance period created a spirit of conquest among the Europeans. The period of Reformation helped to reduce corruption in the Church structures – the clergy, religious and similar organisations.

Important Churches in the Diocese

St.Anthony's shrine Viruduvilanginan

Viruduvilanginan was a sub-station of Athipakkam Parish, Pondicherry Archdiocese. Seven years before Fr. Anthony Thumma, the parish priest of Athipakkam, wanted to make it a separate parish. At that time, in November 1969, when the portions of North Arcot in Tiruvannamalai and Chengam Districts were detached from Pondicherry Archdiocese and attached to Vellore Diocese, Viruduvilenginan was one of those sub-stations with a good number of Catholic families, which became part of the Diocese of Vellore.

S. Lazar, the Vicar Capitular of the Diocese erected this village as a parish and appointed Rev.Fr. A. Nambikairaj as its first priest on 16 February 1970. There are 3 sub-stations, namely, Porrikal, Kadagaman and Valavetty. Fr. A. Nambikairaj started to put up a shrine of St Antony on 16 December 1970. The large granite shrine, built of was blessed on 13 June 1976, the feast of St. Antony. The shrine is still visited by many.

St Lordhu's Shrine, Chetpet

The Mission of Chethupattu, under missionary priest Jean Francois Darras, dates back to 1876. He was born of Mr. Francois Joseph and Marie Josephine Dowey on 16 March 1835. He was ordained on 18 June 1859 along with eight companions. He came to Pondicherry as a missionary; from there he came to the diocese of Vellore. Chethupattu was made a separate Parish on 11 March 1878.

Fr. Darras had taken a vow to build a shrine in honour of Our Lady of Lourdes and built it on a hill top about 2 ½ miles away from Chethupattu. Since this Church was too small, Fr. Darras built a larger one and dedicated it to Our Lady of Lourdes. It was blessed on 1 May 1896, by Rev. Gandi. The feast of Our Lady of Lourdes is celebrated there in the first week of May.

In 1948 the parish priest, later Bishop of North Arcot, S. David Marianayagam, built the present Hill Chapel to replace the old one. Chethupattu has a population of 4,000 Catholics with 21 mission stations. It has a High Secondary School for boys and one for girls, and five Elementary Schools. Sisters of St. Anne’s Madavaram manage the Higher Secondary School for Girls. There are more than 2,000 pupils. The parish also contains the St. Thomas Hospital and Leprosy Centre.
Missionaries include Frs. A. Fernandes, F. Capiaghi, M. Arockiasamy, F. Schlooz, Maria Arul, Peter Mathew, S. Susai and Fr. Thomas George. The Centenary of the shrine of Our Lady of Lourdes was celebrated in March 1978.

Fr. Kuriakos on 26 January 2002 started Marivalam in the hill chapel of Chetpet.

Cathedral

History of the cathedral
The Society of Jesus spread Christianity in Vellore from 1604. In 1854 Vellore was made a parish. In the same year, Assumption church was built. It was under the Madras Archdiocese and looked after by the Mill-Hill Fathers. In 1928, the North Arcot mission was entrusted to the care of Salesians of Don Bosco. On 13 November 1952, Catholic Diocese of Vellore was bifurcated from Arch Diocese Madras-Mylapore and Assumption church was announced as the cathedral of the new born Diocese of Vellore. In 1955, David Maria Nayagam, Bishop of Vellore Diocese, repaired the Assumption Cathedral and consecrated it. During the time of Bishop Michael Augustine, Rev. Msgr. A. Nambikairaj built the right and left wings of the cathedral.

The new cathedral
Even with these extensions, the cathedral had space only for 300 to 500 people. So during the reign of Bishop Chinnappa, the cathedral was demolished and the basement for the new cathedral was blessed in 24 May 1999. The new Cathedral was consecrated on 15 September 2002 by Simon D. Lourdusamy and opened by Bernard Prince. Blessed Sacrament chapel, prayer meeting hall, Glass paintings of 18 important events of salvific history and 15 mysteries of Rosary, and 165 feet height Belfry are special features of the new cathedral. The present cathedral has a capacity for 3,000 to 5,000 people.

Bishops

 Bishops of Vellore (Latin Rite)
 Bishop Pablo Mariaselvam, S.D.B. (1953 – 25 June 1954)
 Bishop David Maryanayagam Swamidoss Pillat, S.D.B. (4 July 1956 – 17 July 1969)
 Bishop Royappan Antony Muthu (23 November 1970 – 19 December 1980)
 Bishop Michael Augustine (10 June 1981 – 18 February 1992), appointed Archbishop of Pondicherry and Cuddalore
 Bishop Malayappan Chinnappa, S.D.B. (17 November 1993 – 1 April 2005), appointed Archbishop of Madras and Mylapore
 Bishop Soundaraj Periyanayagam, S.D.B. (11 July 2006 – 21 March 2020)

Other priests of this diocese who became bishops
Thomas Aquinas Lephonse, appointed Bishop of Coimbatore in 2002
Stephen Antony Pillai, appointed Bishop of Tuticorin in 2019

References

 GCatholic.org
 Catholic Hierarchy
 Vellore Diocese

Roman Catholic dioceses in India
Christian organizations established in 1952
Roman Catholic dioceses and prelatures established in the 20th century
Christianity in Tamil Nadu
1952 establishments in Madras State